Kalemouth is a place in the Scottish Borders area of Scotland, where the Kale Water joins the River Teviot, near to Eckford, Cessford, Crailing, Kelso, and Roxburgh.

Kalemouth Suspension Bridge is a suspension bridge which crosses the River Teviot. There is also the Kalemouth Bridge which carries the A698 over the Kale Water immediately above its entry into the River Teviot.

See also
List of places in the Scottish Borders
List of places in Scotland

References

Sources
The Structural Assessment and Strengthening of Kalemouth Bridge, Scotland, P. Jackson, Routledge

Villages in the Scottish Borders